Luis Felipe Corredor Ramos (born 23 September 1997) is a Venezuelan footballer who plays as a goalkeeper for Zulia F.C. in the Venezuelan Primera División.

References

External links
Profile at Football Database

1997 births
Living people
Aragua FC players
Zulia F.C. players
Venezuelan Primera División players
Venezuelan footballers
Association football goalkeepers
Sportspeople from Maracay
20th-century Venezuelan people
21st-century Venezuelan people